Astegotherium is an extinct genus of xenarthran, belonging to the family Dasypodidae. It lived from the Early to the Middle Eocene, and its fossilized remains are found in Argentina.

Description

This genus is only known from the dermal plates (osteoderms) that composed its dorsal armor. It was probably fairly similar with the modern nine-banded armadillo. Astegotherium was characterized by its osteoderms with a central figure almost devoid of foramina, while the posterior part of the osteoderms has hair foramina.

Classification

The type species, Astegotherium dichotomus, was first described in 1902 by Florentino Ameghino, based on fossil remains found in Argentina, dating to the Middle Eocene. Other fossils attributed to this genus were later discovered in Argentina, in terrains dating from the Early to the Middle-Late Eocene.

Astegotherium is one of the earliest armadillo known in the fossil records, and it is considered a member of the family Dasypodidae, which includes the modern nine-banded armadillo.

Bibliography
Tejedor, M.F., Goin, F.J., Gelfo, J.N., López, G.M., Bond, M., Carlini, A.A, Scillato-Yané, G.J., Woodburne, M.O., Chornogubsky, L., Aragón, E., Reguero, M.A., Czaplewski, N.J., Vincon, S., Martin, G.M., and Ciancio, M. 2009. New early Eocene mammalian fauna from Western Patagonia, Argentina. American Museum Novitates 3638: 1–43.
Ciancio, M.R., Herrera, C., Aramayo, A., Payrola, P., and Babot, J. 2016. Diversity of cingulate xenarthrans in the middle–late Eocene of Northwestern Argentina. Acta Palaeontologica Polonica 61 (3): 575–590.

Armadillos
Prehistoric cingulates
Prehistoric placental genera
Eocene xenarthrans
Eocene genus first appearances
Eocene mammals of South America
Eocene genus extinctions
Paleogene Argentina
Fossils of Argentina
Fossil taxa described in 1902
Taxa named by Florentino Ameghino
Golfo San Jorge Basin
Sarmiento Formation